Night Ride is a 1930 American pre-Code crime film directed by John S. Robertson and written by Charles Logue, Edward T. Lowe, Jr. and Tom Reed. The film stars Joseph Schildkraut, Barbara Kent, Edward G. Robinson, Harry Stubbs, DeWitt Jennings and Ralph Welles. The film was released on January 12, 1930, by Universal Pictures.

Cast 
Joseph Schildkraut as Joe Rooker
Barbara Kent as Ruth Kearns
Edward G. Robinson as Tony Garotta
Harry Stubbs as Bob O'Leary
DeWitt Jennings as Capt. O'Donnell
Ralph Welles as Blondie
Hal Price as Mac
George Ovey as Ed

Preservation status
A trailer is held by the Library of Congress.

References

External links 
 
 

1930 films
1930s English-language films
American crime films
1930 crime films
Universal Pictures films
Films directed by John S. Robertson
American black-and-white films
1930s American films